Liga Deportiva Universitaria de Quito's 2002 season was the club's 72nd year of existence, the 49th year in professional football, and the 41st in the top level of professional football in Ecuador.

Kits
Supplier: Umbro
Sponsor(s): Santal, Helados Pigüino, Parmalat, Hyundai

Squad

Competitions

Serie A

First stage

Results

Second stage

Results

Liguilla Final

Results

References
RSSSF - 2002 Serie A

External links
Official Site 
Olmedo (1) - LDU Quito (1)
LDU Quito (1) - Barcelona SC (0)

2002
Ldu